Zins is a surname. Notable people with the surname include:

Brian Zins, United States Marine Corps officer
Lucien Zins (1922–2002), French swimmer
Voldemārs Žins (1905–?), Latvian footballer

See also
Zin (disambiguation)
Zinn